Adrianus Antonie Henri Willem König  (13 February 1867, Maastricht – 6 February 1944, The Hague) was a Dutch politician.

1867 births
1944 deaths
Ministers of Transport and Water Management of the Netherlands
Roman Catholic State Party politicians
20th-century Dutch politicians
Dutch Roman Catholics
Politicians from Maastricht